Persona is the seventh studio album by the American hip-hop artist and actress, Queen Latifah. Persona was released on August 25, 2009, by Flavor Unit Entertainment. The album marks Queen Latifah's return to hip-hop music since 2002. Persona includes a mix of Latifah rapping and singing and features guest verses by Missy Elliot, Marsha Ambrosius, Shawn Stockman of Boyz II Men, Busta Rhymes, and Mary J. Blige.

Background
In 2008, Latifah was asked if she would make another hip-hop album. She was quoted saying the album was "already done" and it would be called All Hail the Queen II. It was previously stated that her return-to-hip-hop album would be titled, Negativity and Star.

It was rumoured that the album would be titled "The 'L' Word". When Latifah asked about the rumor, she stated it was her attempt to "mess with people's heads" referring to the rumors that she is lesbian.

On September 12, 2008, Rolling Stone reported that Queen Latifah was working on a new album titled, Persona. The song "Cue the Rain" was released as the album's lead single. The other singles from the album include, "Fast Car", "My Couch" and "With You".

The album debuted at number 25 on the Billboard 200, selling 18,000 copies in its first week.

Collaborations
Dre from production duo Cool & Dre teamed up with her for the song titled, "My Couch". Dre lent his vocals for another track titled, "Hard to Love Ya" alongside Busta Rhymes and Boyz II Men's Shawn Stockman. On July 26, 2009, on her Twitter page, Latifah revealed that the second single from the album would be "Fast Car", which included a remix with Missy Elliot and Lil' Kim.

Track listing
"The Light" (produced by Cool & Dre) – 5:04
"Fast Car" (featuring Missy Elliott) (produced by Cool & Dre) – 4:18
"Cue the Rain" (produced by Cool & Dre) – 6:02
"My Couch" (featuring Cool & Dre) (produced by Cool & Dre) – 6:04
"Take Me Away (With You)" (featuring Marsha Ambrosius) (produced by Cool & Dre; co-produced by Queen Latifah) – 3:45
"With You" (produced by Cool & Dre) – 4:34
"Hard to Love You" (featuring Dre, Shawn Stockman of Boyz II Men & Busta Rhymes) (produced by Cool & Dre) – 4:14
"What's the Plan" (produced by Cool & Dre) – 3:10
"Long Ass Week" (produced by Cool & Dre) – 4:11
"Runnin'" (produced by Cool & Dre) – 4:03
"People" (featuring Mary J. Blige) (produced by Cool & Dre) – 3:54
"If He Wanna" (featuring Serani) (produced by The Neptunes) – 4:49
"Over the Mountain" (produced by Cool & Dre; co-produced by Tashaun "Skitz" Spence) – 5:12
"The World" (produced by Cool & Dre; co-produced by Kenny Flav) – 5:31

Charts

References

External links
 Queen Latifah Returns to Rap on New Album at The Star-Ledger
 

2009 albums
Albums produced by Cool & Dre
Albums produced by the Neptunes
Queen Latifah albums